David Kampman (born 2 January 1997) is a Dutch rower. Originally from Rotterdam, he moved to Amsterdam for his studies. He currently rows for A.A.S.R. Skøll in Amsterdam, Netherlands. 

He won a silver medal in the LM4X at the 2019 European Rowing Championships and a bronze medal at the 2019 World Rowing Championships.

References

External links

1997 births
Living people
Dutch male rowers
World Rowing Championships medalists for the Netherlands
20th-century Dutch people
21st-century Dutch people